James Lyle Telford (21 June 1889 – 27 September 1960) was the 24th mayor of Vancouver, British Columbia from 1939 to 1940 and a founder of the British Columbia branch of the Co-operative Commonwealth Federation (CCF). He was born in Valens, Ontario.

Telford was a member of the Legislative Assembly of British Columbia as CCF representative. He campaigned for Vancouver mayor in late 1938, defeating incumbent mayor George Clark Miller by approximately 2000 votes in a city race that involved a total of seven mayoral candidates, which split the right-wing vote. Telford did not maintain CCF party membership as mayor, maintaining that political parties should not be a part of municipal politics. He was also a medical doctor by profession.

See also
Helena Gutteridge

References

External links
Vancouver History: list of mayors, accessed 24 August 2006

1889 births
1960 deaths
Mayors of Vancouver
Politicians from Hamilton, Ontario
British Columbia Co-operative Commonwealth Federation MLAs
20th-century Canadian politicians
Physicians from British Columbia